John MacLaughlin (April 20, 1890 – March 18, 1961) was an American épée and foil fencer. He competed in three events at the 1912 Summer Olympics.

References

External links
 

1890 births
1961 deaths
American male épée fencers
Olympic fencers of the United States
Fencers at the 1912 Summer Olympics
Sportspeople from Rahway, New Jersey
United States Army personnel of World War I
United States Army personnel of World War II
Harvard Crimson fencers
United States Army officers
American male foil fencers
Military personnel from New Jersey